Amor Lake is a lake on Vancouver Island at the head of Amor De Cosmos Creek and northwest of the city of Campbell River. It covers an estimated area of 3.2 km2 (317.6 ha).

References

Mid Vancouver Island
Lakes of Vancouver Island
Sayward Land District